South Central Illinois is a region in the southern part of Illinois; its approximate boundaries are US 50 in the south, and Illinois Highway 16 in the north. Blessed with fertile soil throughout the region, agriculture is a chief industry here. Some of the largest communities in south-central Illinois are Alton, Collinsville, Edwardsville, and Effingham. There is also a South Central Conference (Illinois) of the Illinois High School Association, which includes the schools of: Carlinville, East Alton- Woodriver, Gillespie, Marquette (Alton), Roxana, Southwestern (Piasa), Greenville, Hillsboro, Litchfield, Pana, Staunton, and Vandalia.

See Also
 Central Illinois

External links
 South Central High School Conference (archived on 23 December 2015

Regions of Illinois